Mumble Rap is the eleventh mixtape by Palestinian-Canadian rapper Belly. It was released on October 6, 2017, by XO, Roc Nation and Republic Records. The mixtape features a sole guest appearance from Pusha T. It also features production from Boi-1da, Allen Ritter, Ben Billions, DannyBoyStyles, Frank Dukes, T-Minus and Vinylz, among others.

Background
On October 5, 2017, Belly was featured in an interview on Zane Lowe's Radio show on Beats 1 and announced the project's title, which lists Boi-1da as the executive producer. He also talked about how the mixtape came to fruition, Boi-1da's involvement and reclaiming what the title phrase meant in rap, by stating

Singles
The lead single, "P.O.P." was released on July 25, 2017. The song was produced by Ben Billions. The music video was directed by Director X. It was released August 9, 2017, and features American model Blac Chyna.

Other songs 
The first promotional single is "Lullaby". The music video for Lullaby was released as a Tidal exclusive on October 3, 2017.

The second promotional single is "Mumble Rap". The music video for "Mumble Rap" was released the same day as the mixtape was released.

The third promotional single is "Immigration to the Trap". The music video was released October 13, 2017.

The final promotional single is "The Come Down is Real Too". The music video was released December 6, 2017.

Track listing
Credits were adapted from Tidal.

Notes
  signifies a co-producer
  signifies an additional producer

Sample credits
 "The Come Down Is Real Too" contains a sample from "I'm So into You", performed by SWV
 "Mumble Rap" contains a sample from Ennio Morricone's original composition "Grazie Zia"
 "Papyrus" contains a sample from "Voyages", performed by Michel Polnareff

Personnel
Credits were adapted from Tidal.

Instruments
 DannyBoyStyles – keyboard 
 Ben Billions – keyboard 

Technical
 Faris Al-Majed – recording 
 Danny Schofield – recording 
 Benjamin Diehl – recording , mixing 
 Jaycen Joshua – mixing 
 David Nakaji – mixing assistant 
 Iván Jiménez – mixing assistant 

Creative
 Fluency Creative - creative direction

Charts

References

2017 mixtape albums
Belly (rapper) albums
Albums produced by Boi-1da
Albums produced by Vinylz
Albums produced by T-Minus (record producer)
Albums produced by Frank Dukes